The Western Ghats, also known as the Sahyadri mountain range, is a mountain range that covers an area of  in a stretch of  parallel to the western coast of the Indian peninsula, traversing the states of Gujarat, Maharashtra, Goa, Karnataka, Kerala and Tamil Nadu. It is a UNESCO World Heritage Site and is one of the 36 biodiversity hotspots in the world. It is sometimes called the Great Escarpment of India. It contains a very large proportion of the country's flora and fauna, many of which are endemic to this region. According to UNESCO, the Western Ghats are older than the Himalayas. They influence Indian monsoon weather patterns by intercepting the rain-laden monsoon winds that sweep in from the south-west during late summer. The range runs north to south along the western edge of the Deccan Plateau and separates the plateau from a narrow coastal plain called the Western Coastal Plains along the Arabian Sea. A total of 39 areas in the Western Ghats, including national parks, wildlife sanctuaries and reserve forests, were designated as world heritage sites in 2012 – twenty in Kerala, ten in Karnataka, six in Tamil Nadu and four in Maharashtra.

The range starts near south of the Tapti river and runs approximately  through the states of Gujarat, Maharashtra, Karnataka, Goa, Kerala and Tamil Nadu ending at Marunthuvazh Malai near the southern tip of India. These hills cover  and form the catchment area for complex riverine drainage systems that drain almost 40% of India. The Western Ghats block the southwest monsoon winds from reaching the Deccan Plateau.

The area is one of the world's ten "hottest biodiversity hotspots." It has over 7,402 species of flowering plants, 1,814 species of non-flowering plants, 139 mammal species, 508 bird species, 227 reptile species, 179 amphibian species, 290 freshwater fish species, and 6,000 insect species. It is likely that many undiscovered species live in the Western Ghats. At least 325 globally threatened species occur in the Western Ghats.

Etymology
The word Ghat is explained by numerous Dravidian etymons such as the Tamil gattu (hill and hill forest), Kannada gaati and ghatta (mountain range), Tulu gatta (hill or hillside), and ghattam in Malayalam (mountainous way, riverside and hairpin bends).

Ghat, a term used in the Indian subcontinent, depending on the context could either refer to a range of stepped-hill such as the Eastern Ghats and Western Ghats; or the series of steps leading down to a body of water or wharf, such bathing or cremation place along the banks of a river or pond, Ghats in Varanasi, Dhoby Ghaut or Aapravasi Ghat. Roads passing through ghats are called Ghat Roads.

Geology
The Western Ghats are the mountainous faulted and eroded edge of the Deccan Plateau. Geologic evidence indicates that they were formed during the break-up of the supercontinent of Gondwana some 150 million years ago.Geophysical evidence indicates that the west coast of India came into being somewhere around 100 to 80 mya after it broke away from Madagascar. Other rock types found are charnockites, granite gneiss, khondalites, leptynites, metamorphic gneisses with detached occurrences of crystalline limestone, iron ore, dolerites and anorthosites. Residual laterite and bauxite ores are also found in the southern hills.

Geography

The Western Ghats extend from the Satpura Range in the north, stretching from Gujarat to Tamil Nadu. It traverses south through the states of Maharashtra, Goa, Karnataka and Kerala. Major gaps in the range are the Goa Gap, between the Maharashtra and Karnataka sections, and the Palghat Gap on the Tamil Nadu and Kerala border between the Nilgiri Mountains and the Anaimalai Hills. The mountains intercept the rain-bearing westerly monsoon winds, and are consequently an area of high rainfall, particularly on their western side. The dense forests also contribute to the precipitation of the area by acting as a substrate for condensation of moist rising orographic winds from the sea, and releasing much of the moisture back into the air via transpiration, allowing it to later condense and fall again as rain.

The northern portion of the narrow coastal plain between the Western Ghats and the Arabian Sea is known as the Konkan, the central portion is called Kanara and the southern portion is called Malabar. The foothill region east of the Ghats in Maharashtra is known as Desh, while the eastern foothills of the central Karnataka state is known as Malenadu. The range is known as Sahyadri in Maharashtra and Karnataka. The Western Ghats meet the Eastern Ghats at the Nilgiri mountains in northwestern Tamil Nadu. The Nilgiris connect the Biligiriranga Hills in southeastern Karnataka with the Shevaroys and Tirumala hills. South of the Palghat Gap are the Anamala Hills, located in western Tamil Nadu and Kerala with smaller ranges further south, including the Cardamom Hills, then Aryankavu pass, and Aralvaimozhi pass near Kanyakumari. The range is known as Sahyan or Sahian in Kerala. In the southern part of the range is Anamudi, the highest peak in the Western Ghats. Ooty is called the Queen of the Western Ghats.

Peaks

The Western Ghats have many peaks that rise above , with Anamudi being the highest peak.

Water bodies

The Western Ghats form one of the four watersheds of India, feeding the perennial rivers of India. The major river systems originating in the Western Ghats are the Godavari, Kaveri, Krishna, Thamiraparani and Tungabhadra rivers. The majority of streams draining the Western Ghats join these rivers, and carry a large volume of water during the monsoon months. These rivers flow to the east due to the gradient of the land and drain out into the Bay of Bengal. Major tributaries include the Bhadra, Bhavani, Bhima, Malaprabha, Ghataprabha, Hemavathi and Kabini rivers. The Periyar, Bharathappuzha, Pamba, Netravati, Sharavathi, Kali, Mandovi and Zuari rivers flow westwards towards the Western Ghats, draining into the Arabian Sea, and are fast-moving, owing to the steeper gradient. The rivers have been dammed for hydroelectric and irrigation purposes with major reservoirs spread across the states. The Western Ghats account for 80% of India's hydropower generation. The reservoirs are important for their commercial and sport fisheries of rainbow trout, mahseer and common carp. There are about 50 major dams along the length of the Western Ghats. Most notable of these projects are the Koyna in Maharashtra, Linganmakki and krishna Raja Sagara in Karnataka, Mettur and Pykara in Tamil Nadu, Parambikulam, Malampuzha and Idukki in Kerala. During the monsoon season, numerous streams fed by incessant rain drain off the mountain sides leading to numerous waterfalls. Major waterfalls include Dudhsagar, Unchalli, Sathodi, Magod, Hogenakkal, Jog, Kunchikal, Shivanasamudra, Meenmutty, Adyanpara, Athirappilly, and Coutrallam. Talakaveri is the source of the river Kaveri and the Kuduremukha range is the source of the Tungabhadra. The Western Ghats have several man-made lakes and reservoirs with major lakes at Ooty in Nilgiris, Kodaikanal and Berijam in Palani Hills, Pookode lake, Karlad Lake in Wayanad, Vagamon lake, Devikulam and Letchmi in Idukki, Kerala.

Climate

The area including Agumbe, Hulikal and Amagaon in Karnataka, Mahabaleshwar and Tamhini in Maharashtra are often referred to as the "Cherrapunji of southwest India" or the "rain capital of southwest India". Kollur in Udupi district, Kokkali and Nilkund in Sirsi, Samse in Mudigere of Karnataka, and Neriamangalam in the Ernakulam district of Kerala are the wettest places in the Western Ghats. Heavy precipitation does occur in the surrounding regions due to the long continuity of the mountains without passes and gaps. Changes in the direction and pace of the wind do affect the average rainfall and the wettest places might vary. However, Maharashtra and the northern part of Western Ghats in Karnataka on average receive heavier rainfall than Kerala and the southern part of Western Ghats in Karnataka.

The climate in the Western Ghats varies with altitudinal gradation and distance from the equator. The climate is humid and tropical in the lower reaches tempered by the proximity to the sea. In some parts frost is common, and temperatures reach the freezing point during the winter months. It has also been observed that the coldest periods in the South Western Ghats coincide with the wettest.

During the monsoon season between June and September, the unbroken Western Ghats chain acts as a barrier to the moisture-laden clouds. The heavy, eastward-moving rain-bearing clouds are forced to rise and in the process deposit most of their rain on the windward side. The total amount of rain does not depend on the spread of the area; areas in northern Maharashtra receive heavy rainfall followed by long dry spells, while regions closer to the equator receive lower annual rainfall and have rain spells lasting several months in a year.

Rainfall

The Karnataka region on average receives heavier rainfall than the Kerala, Maharashtra and Goa regions. Meanwhile, the Ghats in Karnataka have fewer passes and gaps and therefore the western slopes of Karnataka receive heavy rainfall, over 400 cm more than other regional parts of the Western Ghats.

Some of the wettest places in the Western Ghats are:

Ecoregions

The Western Ghats are home to four tropical and subtropical moist broadleaf forest ecoregions – the North Western Ghats moist deciduous forests, North Western Ghats montane rain forests, South Western Ghats moist deciduous forests, and South Western Ghats montane rain forests. The northern portion of the range is generally drier than the southern portion, and at lower elevations makes up the North Western Ghats moist deciduous forests ecoregion, with mostly deciduous forests made up predominantly of teak. Above 1,000 meters elevation are the cooler and wetter North Western Ghats montane rain forests, whose evergreen forests are characterised by trees of the family Lauraceae.

The evergreen forests in Wayanad mark the transition zone between the northern and southern ecoregions of the Western Ghats. The southern ecoregions are generally wetter and more species-rich. At lower elevations are the South Western Ghats moist deciduous forests, with Cullenia the characteristic tree genus, accompanied by teak, dipterocarps, and other trees. The moist forests transition to the drier South Deccan Plateau dry deciduous forests, which lie in its rain shadow to the east. Above 1,000 meters are the South Western Ghats montane rain forests, also cooler and wetter than the surrounding lowland forests, and dominated by evergreen trees, although some montane grasslands and stunted forests can be found at the highest elevations. The South Western Ghats montane rain forests are the most species-rich ecoregion in peninsular India; eighty percent of the flowering plant species of the entire Western Ghats range are found in this ecoregion.

Biodiversity protection

Historically the Western Ghats were covered in dense forests that provided wild foods and natural habitats for native tribal people. Its inaccessibility made it difficult for people from the plains to cultivate the land and build settlements. After the establishment of British colonial rule in the region, large swathes of territory were cleared for agricultural plantations and timber. The forest in the Western Ghats has been severely fragmented due to human activities, especially clear-felling for tea, coffee, and teak plantations from 1860 to 1950. Species that are rare, endemic and habitat specialists are more adversely affected and tend to be lost faster than other species. Complex and species rich habitats like the tropical rainforest are much more adversely affected than other habitats.

The area is ecologically sensitive to development and was declared an ecological hotspot in 1988 through the efforts of ecologist Norman Myers. The area covers five percent of India's land; 27% of all species of higher plants in India (4,000 of 15,000 species) are found here and 1,800 of these are endemic to the region. The range is home to at least 84 amphibian species, 16 bird species, seven mammals, and 1,600 flowering plants which are not found elsewhere in the world. The Government of India has established many protected areas including 2 biosphere reserves, 13 national parks to restrict human access, several wildlife sanctuaries to protect specific endangered species and many reserve forests, which are all managed by the forest departments of their respective state to preserve some of the ecoregions still undeveloped. The Nilgiri Biosphere Reserve, comprising  of the evergreen forests of Nagarahole and deciduous forests of Bandipur in Karnataka, adjoining regions of Wayanad-Mukurthi in Kerala and Mudumalai National Park-Sathyamangalam in Tamil Nadu, forms the largest contiguous protected area in the Western Ghats. Silent Valley in Kerala is among the last tracts of virgin tropical evergreen forest in India.

In August 2011, the Western Ghats Ecology Expert Panel (WGEEP) designated the entire Western Ghats as an Ecologically Sensitive Area (ESA) and assigned three levels of Ecological Sensitivity to its different regions. The panel, headed by ecologist Madhav Gadgil, was appointed by the Union Ministry of Environment and Forests to assess the biodiversity and environmental issues of the Western Ghats. The Gadgil Committee and its successor, the Kasturirangan Committee, recommended suggestions to protect the Western Ghats. The Gadgil report was criticised as being too environment-friendly and the Kasturirangan report was labelled as being anti-environmental.

In 2006, India applied to the UNESCO Man and the Biosphere Programme (MAB) for the Western Ghats to be listed as a protected World Heritage Site. In 2012, the following places were declared as World Heritage Sites:

 Kali Tiger Reserve, Dandeli, Karnataka
 Indira Gandhi Wildlife Sanctuary and National Park, Tamil Nadu
 Mundigekere Bird Sanctuary, Sirsi, Karnataka
 Kalakkad Mundanthurai Tiger Reserve, Tamil Nadu
 Thattekad Bird Sanctuary, Kerala
 Shendurney Wildlife Sanctuary, Kerala
 Neyyar Wildlife Sanctuary, Kerala
 Peppara Wildlife Sanctuary, Kerala
 Periyar Tiger Reserve, Kerala
 Srivilliputtur Wildlife Sanctuary, Tamil Nadu
 Eravikulam National Park, Kerala
 Grass Hills National Park, Tamil Nadu and Kerala
 Karian Shola National Park, Karnataka
 Sathyamangalam Wildlife Sanctuary, Tamil Nadu
 Chinnar Wildlife Sanctuary, Kerala
 Silent Valley National Park, Kerala
 Karimpuzha Wildlife Sanctuary, Kerala
 Mukurthi National Park, Tamil Nadu
 Pushpagiri Wildlife Sanctuary, Karnataka
 Brahmagiri Wildlife Sanctuary, Karnataka
 Mookambika Wildlife Sanctuary, Karnataka
 Talakaveri Wildlife Sanctuary, Karnataka
 Aralam Wildlife Sanctuary, Kerala
 Kudremukh National Park, Karnataka
 Someshwara Wildlife Sanctuary, Karnataka
 Kaas Plateau, Maharashtra
 Bhimashankar Wildlife Sanctuary, Maharashtra
 Koyna Wildlife Sanctuary, Maharashtra
 Chandoli National Park, Maharashtra
 Radhanagari Wildlife Sanctuary, Maharashtra
 Parambikulam Wildlife Sanctuary, Kerala
 Pambadum Shola National Park, Kerala
 Anamudi Shola National Park, Kerala
 Chimmony Wildlife Sanctuary
 Peechi-Vazhani Wildlife Sanctuary, Kerala
 Wayanad Wildlife Sanctuary, Kerala
 Mathikettan Shola National Park, Kerala
 Kurinjimala Sanctuary, Kerala
 Karimpuzha National Park, Kerala
 Idukki Wildlife Sanctuary
 Ranipuram National Park
 Megamalai Wildlife Sanctuary, Tamil Nadu
 Palani Hills Wildlife Sanctuary and National Park, Tamil Nadu
 Kanyakumari Wildlife Sanctuary, Tamil Nadu
 Bandipur National Park , Karnataka
 Nagarhole National Park, Karnataka
 Nilgiri Biosphere Reserve, Tamil Nadu
 Mudumalai National Park, Tamil Nadu

Fauna
The Western Ghats are home to thousands of animal species including at least 325 globally threatened species.

Mammals

There are at least 139 mammal species. Of the 16 endemic mammals, 13 are threatened. Among the 32 threatened species are the tiger, leopard, lion-tailed macaque, Nilgiri tahr, Asian elephant, Nilgiri langur and gaur. The endemic Malabar large-spotted civet is estimated to number fewer than 250 mature individuals, with no sub-population greater than 50 individuals.
The Nilgiri marten, brown palm civet, stripe-necked mongoose, Indian brown mongoose, small Indian civet and leopard cat are the small carnivores living in the forests of the Western Ghats.

The hill ranges constitute important wildlife corridors and form an important part of Project Elephant and Project Tiger reserves. The largest tiger population lives in the Western Ghats, where there are seven populations with an estimated population size of 1200 individuals occupying  of forest in three major landscape units spread across Karnataka, Tamil Nadu and Kerala. The Western Ghats ecoregion has the largest Indian elephant population in the wild with an estimated 11,000 individuals across eight distinct populations. The endemic Nilgiri tahr, which was on the brink of extinction, has recovered and has an estimated 3,122 individuals in the wild. About 3500 lion-tailed macaques live scattered over several areas in the Western Ghats.

Reptiles
At least 227 species of reptiles are found in the Western Ghats. The major population of the snake family Uropeltidae is restricted to the region. Several endemic reptile genera and species occur here, including the cane turtle Vijayachelys silvatica, lizards like Salea, Ristella, Kaestlea, and snakes such as Melanophidium, Plectrurus, Teretrurus, Platyplectrurus, Xylophis, and Rhabdops. Species-level endemism is much higher and is common to almost all genera present here. Some enigmatic endemic reptiles include venomous snakes such as the striped coral snake, the Malabar pit viper, the large-scaled pitviper and the horseshoe pitviper. The region has a significant population of the mugger crocodile.

Amphibians
The amphibians of the Western Ghats are diverse and unique, with more than 80% of the 179 amphibian species being endemic to the rainforests of the mountains. The purple frog was discovered in 2003. Several species of frogs, namely of the genera Micrixalus, Indirana, and Nyctibatrachus, are endemic to this region. Endemic genera include the toads Pedostibes, Ghatophryne, and Xanthophryne; arboreal frogs such as Ghatixalus, Mercurana, and Beddomixalus; and microhylids like Melanobatrachus. New frog species were described from the Western Ghats in 2005, and more recently a new species, monotypic  in its genus Mysticellus, was discovered.
The region is also home to many caecilian species. There are many species of amphibians which are yet to be discovered at every elevation of the Western Ghats.

Fish

, 288 freshwater fish species were listed for the Western Ghats, including 35 also known from brackish or marine water. Several new species have been described from the region since then (e.g., Dario urops and S. sharavathiensis). There are 118 endemic species, including 13 genera entirely restricted to the Western Ghats (Betadevario, Dayella, Haludaria, Horabagrus, Horalabiosa, Hypselobarbus, Indoreonectes, Lepidopygopsis, Longischistura, Mesonoemacheilus, Parapsilorhynchus, Rohtee and Travancoria).

There is a higher fish richness in the southern part of the Western Ghats than in the northern, and the highest is in the Chalakudy River, which alone holds 98 species. Other rivers with high species numbers include the Periyar, Bharatapuzha, Pamba and Chaliyar, as well as upstream tributaries of the Kaveri, Pambar, Bhavani and Krishna rivers. The most species rich families are the Cyprinids (72 species), hillstream loaches (34 species; including stone loaches, now regarded a separate family), Bagrid catfishes (19 species) and Sisorid catfishes (12 species). The region is home to several brilliantly coloured ornamental fishes like the Denison (or red line torpedo) barb, melon barb, several species of Dawkinsia barbs, zebra loach, Horabagrus catfish, dwarf pufferfish and dwarf Malabar pufferfish. The rivers are also home to Osteobrama bakeri, and larger species such as the Malabar snakehead and Malabar mahseer. A few are adapted to an underground life, including some Rakthamichthys swampeels, and the catfish Horaglanis and Kryptoglanis.

According to the IUCN, 97 freshwater fish species from the Western Ghats were considered threatened in 2011, including 12 critically endangered, 54 endangered and 31 vulnerable. All but one (Tor khudree) of these are endemic to the Western Ghats. An additional 26 species from the region are considered data deficient (their status is unclear at present). The primary threats are from habitat loss, but also from overexploitation and introduced species.

Birds

There are at least 508 bird species. Most of Karnataka's five hundred species of birds are from the Western Ghats region. There are at least 16 species of birds endemic to the Western Ghats including the endangered rufous-breasted laughingthrush, the vulnerable Nilgiri wood-pigeon, white-bellied shortwing and broad-tailed grassbird, the near threatened grey-breasted laughingthrush, black-and-rufous flycatcher, Nilgiri flycatcher, and Nilgiri pipit, and the least concern Malabar (blue-winged) parakeet, Malabar grey hornbill, white-bellied treepie, grey-headed bulbul, rufous babbler, Wayanad laughingthrush, white-bellied blue-flycatcher and the crimson-backed sunbird.

Insects
There are roughly 6,000 insect species. Of 334 Western Ghats butterfly species, 316 species have been reported from the Nilgiri Biosphere Reserve. The Western Ghats are home to 174 species of odonates (107 dragonflies and 67 damselflies), including 69 endemics. Most of the endemic odonate are closely associated with rivers and streams, while the non-endemics typically are generalists.
There are several species of leeches found all along the Western Ghats.

Mollusks
Seasonal rainfall patterns of the Western Ghats necessitate a period of dormancy for its land snails, resulting in their high abundance and diversity including at least 258 species of gastropods from 57 genera and 24 families. A total of 77 species of freshwater molluscs (52 gastropods and 25 bivalves) have been recorded from the Western Ghats, but the actual number is likely higher. This include 28 endemics. Among the threatened freshwater molluscs are the mussels Pseudomulleria dalyi, which is a Gondwanan relict, and the snail Cremnoconchus, which is restricted to the spray zone of waterfalls. According to the IUCN, 4 species of freshwater molluscs are considered endangered and 3 are vulnerable. An additional 19 species are considered data deficient.

Flora

The dominant forest type here is tropical rainforest. Montane forests, tropical dry forests and tropical moist forests are also found here. Of the 7,402 species of flowering plants occurring in the Western Ghats, 5,588 species are native or indigenous and 376 are exotics naturalised; 1,438 species are cultivated or planted as ornamentals. Among the indigenous species, 2,253 species are endemic to India and of them, 1,273 species are exclusively confined to the Western Ghats. Apart from 593 confirmed subspecies and varieties; 66 species, 5 subspecies and 14 varieties of doubtful occurrence are also reported, amounting to 8,080 taxa of flowering plants.
Various plant species are endemic to the Western Ghats, including the palm tree Bentinckia condapanna and the flower Strobilanthes kunthiana. A number of plant species are also Critically Endangered, such as Dipterocarpus bourdillonii and Phyllanthus anamalayanus.

Echinops sahyadricus is endemic to the mountains, and the specific epithet sahyadricus is refers to them.

Threats

The Western Ghats face a lot of issues. Poaching, deforestation, forest fires, extra hunting and dangers to native tribes are the main threats. Despite the 1972 Indian law of that banned poaching, people still tend to illegally hunt down animals such as tigers, elephants and chital for skin, fur or tusks. Forests here are being destroyed for farming or livestock. Animals that eat livestock are also being killed by farmers. Forest fires take place annually during the dry summer season, especially in the Nagarhole-Bandipur-Wayanad-Mudumalai-Satyamangalam-BRT block which has the most biodiverse locations in the Western Ghats with the largest populations of tigers and elephants residing there.

Native tribes of the Western Ghats are being evicted from their homelands. This results in degradation of the tribal culture. The rich biodiversity in both flora and fauna have made the Western Ghats a target for many corporate companies to gain resources. This however is checked by the Government of India and the State Governments to protect the Western Ghats.

See also
 Ghat Roads
 Eastern Ghats

Notes

References

 Mahajan, Harshal. A rendezvous with Sahyadri
 Ingalhalikar, Shrikant. Flowers of Sahyadri. Corolla Publication; Pune
 Wikramanayake, Eric; Eric Dinerstein; Colby J. Loucks; et al. (2002). Terrestrial Ecoregions of the Indo-Pacific: a Conservation Assessment. Island Press; Washington, DC.
 Kapadia, Harish. Trek the Sahyadris
 Daniels, R.J. Ranjit, Wildlife institute of India, "Biodiversity in the Western Ghats"
 Ajith Kumar, Sálim Ali Centre for Ornithology and Natural History, Coimbatore, India, Ravi Chellam, B.C.Choudhury, Divya Mudappa, Karthikeyan Vasudevan, N.M.Ishwar, Wildlife Institute of India, Dehra Dun, India, Barry Noon, Department of Fish and Wildlife Biology, Colorado State University, Fort Collins, U.S. (2002) "Impact of Rainforest Fragmentation on Small Mammals and Herpetofauna in the Western Ghats, South India", Final Report, pp. 146, illus. Full text retrieved 14 March 2007
 Verma Desh Deepak (2002) "Thematic Report on Mountain Ecosystems", Ministry of Environment and Forests,13pp, retrieved 27 March 2007 Thematic Report on Mountain Ecosystems Full text, detailed data, not cited.
 Abstracts, Edited by Lalitha Vijayan, Saconr. Vasudeva, University of Dharwad, Priyadarsanan, ATREE, Renee Borges, CES, ISSC, Jagdish Krishnaswamy, Atree & WCSP. Pramod, Sacon, Jagannatha Rao, R., FRLHTR. J. Ranjit Daniels, Care Earth, Compiled by S. Somasundaram, Sacon (1–2 December 2005) Integrating Science and Management of Biodiversity in the Western Ghats, 2nd National Conference of the Western Ghats Forum, Venue: State Forest Service College Coimbatore, Organized by Sálim Ali Centre for Ornithology and Natural History, Anaikatty, Coimbatore – 641108, India. Sponsored by Ministry of Environment and Forests, Government of India. Supported by The Arghyam Foundation, The Ford Foundation & Sir Dorabiji Trust Through Ashoka Trust for Research in Ecology and the Environment (ATREE)
 Shifting Cultivation, Sacred Groves and Conflicts in Colonial Forest Policy in the Western Ghats. M.D. Subash Chandran; Chapter 22

External links 
 Western Ghats, UNESCO World Heritage site
 Western Ghats, WWF

 
Mountain ranges of India
Physiographic provinces
World Heritage Sites in India
Landforms of Tamil Nadu
Landforms of Maharashtra
Landforms of Karnataka
Landforms of Kerala
Landforms of Goa
Landforms of Gujarat
Mountains in Buddhism
Freshwater ecoregions